Ramakkalmedu is a hill station and a hamlet in Idukki district in the Indian state of Kerala. The place is noted for its panoramic beauty and numerous windmills.

Location 
It is located about 15 km from Nedumkandam on the Munnar-Thekkady route. Nearby towns are Thookkupalam (5 km), Kattappana (25 km), and Kumily (40 km).

Geography

Flora and fauna
The ecosystem of the area consists largely of grass land Shola forest type which is laced by sporadic bamboo forests.

Climate
Constant wind is another factor which makes Ramakkalmedu unique. Wind blows at a speed around 35 km/ hour at Ramakkalmedu throughout the year irrespective of the season and time.

Wind Energy
Villages like Pushpakandam and Kuruvikanam near Ramakkalmedu is the second place in Kerala where wind energy farm is installed, though it is private holdings. Currently the capacity is at about 14.25 MW of NEG MICON Make Wind Mills. This electricity is distributed to Kerala State Electricity Board.even though Ramakkalmedu has potential to produce much electricity, as it is said to be one of  Asia's largest wind blowing area.

Tourism

Although Ramakkalmedu has potential for it to become an international tourist destination, and already attracts more than 100,000 visitors. However, as of 2015 not much had been done for the improvement of basic facilities nearby. The government of Kerala has announced plans to develop this tourist station by improving transportation facilities with buses, upgrading of the Kerala police and other measures.tortoise rock, kuravan hills, rama rock, wind mills view point, soolapara hilla, hyderamala hills are part of Ramaklalmedu tourisum circle

Kuravan  and  Kurathi

Ramakalmedu  is  a  historic site  with  a  Monument  to   Kuravan  and  Kurathi – a large statue that  depicts  the Sangam Period  and  Sangam landscape  of  Kerala  and  Tamil Nadu. The monument provides a panoramic view of Tamil Nadu villages and towns, including Cumbum, Theni, Kombai, Thevaram, Uthamapalayam, Bodinaykannor and Vaiga. Rolling green hills and the fresh mountain air make Ramakalmedu an enchanting retreat. The view is striking at dusk when all these towns in Tamil Nadu,  are lighted.

Rama – kal – medu literally means "Land of Rama’s Stone" or "Land where Rama set his holy foot" (Rama is a Hindu deity in the epic Ramayana). One story says that Rama along with Lakshmana (younger brother of Rama who was accompanying him during his 14 years exile in the forest) kept his foot at the top of Ramakkalmedu in search of his wife Sita, who was abducted by the rakshasa king of Lanka, Ravana.

The Twin statue was sculpted by C.B Jinan and  erected on the top of the hill in the year 2005. The statue depicts two historical characters who have some connection with  the construction of the Idukki Dam. The Idukki Arch dam connects two massive rock hills named  Kuravan Mala (Kuravan Hill)  and Kurathi Mala(Kurathi Hill). .

Gallery

References

Villages in Idukki district
Hill stations in Kerala
Tourist attractions in Idukki district
Geography of Idukki district